Karim Bougherara is a French-Algerian rugby union player who currently plays for Union Sportive Bressane and is an Algerian international. He plays as a prop.

Playing career
Bougherara started with the Bourgoin-Jallieu during the 2010-11 season where he plays only one match of the Top 14 and four matches of the European Challenge. In order to increase his playing time, he left the Berjallian club at the end of the season to join the Auch Gers evolved in Pro D2. He stayed two seasons until 2013 when he signed a contract with the Section Paloise.

References

External links
itsrugby.fr profile

French rugby union players
Living people
French sportspeople of Algerian descent
1989 births
CS Bourgoin-Jallieu players
RC Toulonnais players
Rugby union props
Sportspeople from Vienne, Isère
Section Paloise players
RC Massy players